Friedrich Kallmorgen (15 November 1856 in Hamburg – 2 June 1924 in Karlsruhe) was a German Impressionist painter who specialized in landscapes and cityscapes.

Biography 
His father was an architect. From 1862 to 1863, he received his first drawing lessons from his uncle, the portrait and landscape painter . In 1875, he enrolled at the Kunstakademie Düsseldorf, where he studied with Andreas Müller, Ernst Deger and Eugen Dücker. After a study trip to Franconian Switzerland, with Carl Friedrich Lessing, he attended the Academy of Fine Arts, Karlsruhe, where he was originally taught by Ernst Hildebrand, followed by Hans Fredrik Gude.

In the summer of 1878, he undertook painting expeditions to Lüneburg Heath and the Harz Mountains. In 1881, after a brief stay in Berlin, he returned to Karlsruhe and completed his studies with Gustav Schönleber.

Together with Schönleber and Hermann Baisch, he took trips to France, Belgium and Holland. Upon their return, he married the flower painter, Margarethe Hormuth. In 1889, he became one of the founders of the Grötzingen artists' colony. Two years later, Frederick I, Grand Duke of Baden named him a Professor. During the 1890s, he designed trading cards for the Stollwerck chocolate company of Cologne. His 1899 series on Italian folksongs was especially popular.

In 1901, he was appointed a teacher of landscape painting at the Berlin University of the Arts, succeeding Eugen Bracht. In 1908, he was awarded a gold medal at the "Große Berliner Kunstausstellung". He continued to travel widely, visiting Norway and Russia. After a brief residency in Heidelberg, he returned to the artists' colony near Karlsruhe and died there.

Selected paintings

References

Further reading 
 Friedrich Kallmorgen: In's Land der Mitternachtssonne. Tagebuch eines Malers. Künstlerbund Karlsruhe, Karlsruhe 1899. Digitalized @ the Heidelberger Historische Bestände
 Galerie Herold (Ed.): Friedrich Kallmorgen 1856–1924. Leben und Werk. Christians Verlag, Hamburg 1981, .
 Irene Eder: Friedrich Kallmorgen 1856–1924. Monographie und Werkverzeichnis der Gemälde und Druckgraphik. Harsch Verlag, Karlsruhe 1991, .
 Helga Walter-Dressler (Ed.): Mit Kallmorgen unterwegs. Zeichnungen und Gemälde von 1880 bis 1920. (Exhibition catalog from the Städtische Galerie in Karlsruhe, 21 December 1991 to 16 February 1992)

External links 

 ArtNet: More works by Kallmorgen.
 

1856 births
1924 deaths
19th-century German painters
19th-century German male artists
20th-century German painters
20th-century German male artists
German landscape painters
Cityscape artists
Artists from Hamburg